900 Block North Seventh Street Historic District is a historic district which was listed on the National Register of Historic Places in 1998.  Also known as Silk Stocking Row Historic District, the district included nine contributing buildings at 901, 905, 907, 909, and 911 N. 7th St. in Garden City, Kansas.

The street was known as "Silk Stocking Row" in the early 1900s.  The district includes five houses, two barns, three garages, and a storage shed.

References

External links

Historic districts on the National Register of Historic Places in Kansas
Queen Anne architecture in Kansas
Colonial Revival architecture in Kansas
Buildings and structures completed in 1908
Finney County, Kansas